Golden cat may refer to:

 African golden cat, Caracal aurata, a wild cat distributed in the rain forests of West and Central Africa
 Asian golden cat, Catopuma temminckii, a medium-sized wild cat of South-Eastern Asia
 Bay cat, Catopuma badia, a wild cat endemic to the island of Borneo

Animal common name disambiguation pages